Events from the year 1381 in Ireland.

Incumbent
Lord: Richard II

Events
McDonaghs take possession of Ballymote Castle, County Sligo from the Mac Diarmada

Births

Deaths

 
1380s in Ireland
Ireland
Years of the 14th century in Ireland